Vladimir Gligorov (Serbian and Macedonian: Владимир Глигоров; 24 September 1945 – 27 October 2022) was a Serbian economist of Macedonian descent. He was a founder of the Democratic Party in Serbia in December 1989. He was the son of the first President of the Republic of Macedonia, Kiro Gligorov.

Gligorov earned his master's degree at the Columbia University and the University of Belgrade working subsequently at both institutions as an assistant. At the University of Belgrade he worked at the Faculty of Political Sciences. He cooperated with the Institute of Economic Sciences in Belgrade until 1991. Gligorov was a Senior Research Associate at The Vienna Institute for International Economic Studies. He worked as a lecturer at the University of Vienna and professor at the University of Graz. He was a Visiting Fellow at George Mason University, University of Virginia, Uppsala University and Institut für die Wissenschaften vom Menschen.

Gligorov died in Vienna on 27 October 2022, at the age of 77.

References

External links
The Vienna Institute for International Economic Studies

1945 births
2022 deaths
Macedonian economists
Democratic Party (Serbia) politicians
Politicians from Belgrade
Serbian economists
Serbian people of Macedonian descent
Columbia University alumni
University of Virginia fellows
George Mason University fellows
University of Belgrade alumni
Academic staff of the University of Vienna
Academic staff of the University of Graz
20th-century economists
21st-century economists